KQEW 102.3 FM is a radio station licensed to Fordyce, Arkansas.  The station broadcasts a News-Talk format and is owned by Dallas Properties, Inc.

References

External links
KQEW's website

QEW
News and talk radio stations in the United States